is a passenger railway station located in the city of Himeji, Hyōgo Prefecture, Japan, operated by the private Sanyo Electric Railway.

Lines

Station layout
The station consists of two unnumbered ground-level side platforms connected by a level crossing. The station is unattended.

Platforms

Adjacent stations

|-
!colspan=5|Sanyo Electric Railway

History
Yaka Station opened on August 19, 1923.

The station building was renovated in 1982.

Passenger statistics
In fiscal 2018, the station was used by an average of 1496 passengers daily (boarding passengers only).

Surrounding area
 Kiba Yacht Harbor
Shiroya Seaside Park
Himeji City Yagi Elementary School

See also
List of railway stations in Japan

References

External links

 Official website (Sanyo Electric Railway) 

Railway stations in Japan opened in 1923
Railway stations in Himeji